Sondre Turvoll Fossli (born 10 August 1993) is a Norwegian cross-country skier who competed between 2010 and 2019. He won his only World Cup race in the individual classic sprint event in Rukatunturi on 27 November 2015.

On 12 August, 2019, Fossli suffered sudden cardiac arrest while out on a car ride with his girlfriend in Oslo. Paramedics were able to get his heart beating again by using a defibrillator and he was subsequently hospitalized at Oslo University Hospital. He spent ten days at the hospital, but the physicians were not able to find the cause why his heart stopped beating. In December 2019, he underwent an operation, and was fitted with a implantable cardioverter-defibrillator.

As a result of the cardiac arrest, he announced his retirement from cross-country skiing in April 2020.

Cross-country skiing results
All results are sourced from the International Ski Federation (FIS).

World Cup

Season standings

Individual podiums
1 victory – (1 ) 
4 podiums – (3 , 1 )

References

1993 births
Living people
People from Øvre Eiker
Norwegian male cross-country skiers
Sportspeople from Viken (county)